The Lycini is a species-rich beetle tribe belonging to the subfamily Lycinae

Description

The Lycini is defined by the presence of the rostrum, flat, serrate to parallel-sided antennomeres 3–10, absent pronotal carinae, weak longitudinal and absent or irregular transverse costae in the elytra, tubular mesothoracic spiracles, the spoon-shaped phallobase, short parameres, a long and slender phallus, large lateral glands in the female sexual duct, short valvifers and the short spermaduct.

Distribution
Afrotropical, Palaearctic, Oriental, Australian (Sulawesi and Timor only), Nearctic and Neotropical (northern part only) regions.

Genera
A 2021 study delimited the following genera based on mito-ribosomal data.

 Celiasis Laporte, 1840
 Haplolycus Bourgeois, 1883
 Lipernes Waterhouse, 1879
 Lycostomus Motschulsky, 1861
 Lycus Fabricius, 1787
 Neolycus Bourgeois, 1883
 Rhyncheros LeConte, 1881

References

Lycidae
Beetle tribes